Sambal or Sambali is a Sambalic language spoken primarily in the Zambal municipalities of Santa Cruz, Candelaria, Masinloc, Palauig, and Iba, and in the Pangasinense municipality of Infanta in the Philippines; speakers can also be found in Panitian, Quezon, Palawan and Barangay Mandaragat or Buncag of Puerto Princesa. The speakers of the language are decreasing due to the fact that many of the speakers are shifting to Tagalog.

The first European-produced reference grammar of any indigenous language of the Philippines was that of Zambal, published circa 1601.

Dialects 
Ethnologue reports Santa Cruz, Masinloc and Iba as dialects of the language.

Name
The language is occasionally referred to as zambal, which is the hispanized form of Sambal.

Sambal had also for a time been referred to as Tina, a term still encountered in older sources. The term, however, which means 'bleached' in the Botolan variety of the language, is considered offensive. The pejorative term was first used in the late 1970s by researchers from the Summer Institute of Linguistics (now SIL International). Sambals would not normally recognize the reference.

Phonology
Sambali has 19 phonemes: 16 consonants and three vowels. Syllable structure is relatively simple.

Vowels
Sambali has three vowels. They are:
/a/ an open front unrounded vowel similar to English 'father'
/i/ a close front unrounded vowel similar to English 'machine'
/u/ (written as ‘o’) a close back unrounded vowel similar to English 'flute'

Consonants
Below is a chart of Sambal consonants. All the stops are unaspirated. The velar nasal occurs in all positions including at the beginning of a word.

Note: Consonants  and  sometimes interchange, as they were once allophones. Dy is pronounced , ny , sy , and ty .

Stress
Stress is phonemic in Sambal. Word stress is very important; it differentiates homonyms, e.g.

Historical sound changes

Grammar

Nouns

Zambal pronouns

Common singular pronouns

 ang, 'yung (iyong) – yay hikon-mong, ya-rin hikon-moy
 ng, n'ung (niyong) – nin kon-moyo
 Sa – ha
 Nasa – Ison ha ('near'), Itaw ha ('far')

Common plural pronouns

 ang mgá, 'yung mgá (iyong mgá) – yay + first letter of plural word + aw
 (e.g. yay bawbabayi – ang mga babae; yay lawlalaki – ang mga lalaki)
 ng mgá, n'ung mgá (niyong mgá) – nin yay + first letter of plural word + aw
 (e.g. nin bawbabayi – ng mga babae, nin lawlalaki – ng mga lalaki)
 sa mgá – ha first letter of plural word + aw (e.g. habawbabayi – sa mga babae, halawlalaki – sa mga ki)
 Nasa mga – Iti, ison, itaw + pronoun

Personal singular pronouns

 Si – hi
 Ni – Ni
 Kay – Kun ni
 Na kay – hikun

Personal plural

 Sina – Hila
 Nina – ni
 Kina – Kun li
 Nakina – Hikunla

Note: In a general conversation, hi is usually omitted or contracted from the pronoun: e.g. Hikunla tana hiya rin (sa kanila na lang iyan) is simply ‘kunla tana ‘ya-rin or even shorter, as ‘kunlay na rin.

Example:

'The man arrived.' Dumating ang lalaki:

 Nakalato hiyay lalaki or nakalato ‘yay lalaki or ‘yay tawo.
 Linu-mato hiyay lalaki; or
 Lin’mato ‘yay lalaki or ‘yay tawo.

 Yay (referring to object)
 Hiyay (singular person)
 Hikamon (plural second person)
 Hilay (plural third person)

Nakita ni Juan si Maria – Na-kit ni Juan hi Maria. 'John saw Mary.'

Note that in Philippine languages, even the names of people require an article.

Plural nominal article
'Helen and Robert will go to Miguel's house.'

 Pupunta sina Elena at Roberto sa bahay ni Miguel.
 Maku hila Elena tan Roberto ha bali ni Miguel.
 Pupunta ako – maku-ko
 Papunta – ma-mako
 Punta – mako
 Pumupunta – ampako
 Pupuntahan – ampaku-tawan\makuku-son

'Father has the keys.'

 Nasaan ang mga aklat?
 Ayti yay lawlibro?
 Na kay Tatay ang mga susi.
 Hikun niTatay yay sawsusi or ‘Kunni Tatay yay sawsusi

'That baby is healthy.'

 Malusog ang sanggol.
 Maganda yay lalaman nya-nin makating/makalog.

Pronouns
Personal pronouns are categorized by case. The indirect forms also function as the genitive.

Examples:

'I wrote.'
Sulat is hulat (Masinloc) or sulat (Sta. Cruz)
Sumulat ako. Humulat ko or Sumulat ko.

Sinulatan ako ng liham. Hinulatan nya hiko or hinulatan nya’ ko.
'He/She wrote me a letter.' Hinomulat ya ‘kunko, nanulat ya kunko, or hinulatan mya ko.

Ibibigay ko sa kaniyá. Ebi ko ‘kunna (hikuna).
'I will give it to him/her.'

Genitive pronouns follow the word they modify. Oblique pronouns can take the place of the genitive pronoun but they precede the word they modify.

Ang bahay ko. Yay bali ko.
Ang aking bahay. Yay ‘kunkon bali.
'My house.'

Interrogative words

Sample texts

Philippine national proverb
Below is a translation in Sambal of the Philippine national proverb "He who does not acknowledge his beginnings will not reach his destination," followed by the original in Tagalog.
Sambal: 
Tagalog:

The Lord's Prayer

Version from Matthew

Version from Luke

Examples

Numbers
Sambal numbers are listed below.

Common expressions

See also
Sambal people
Zambales
Languages of the Philippines

References

External links

 Zambal-language resources at the SIL

Languages of Zambales
Sambalic languages